There are 12 sovereign states and 4 non-sovereign dependent territories in South America. The continent is bordered on the west by the Pacific Ocean and on the north and east by the Atlantic Ocean. North America and the Caribbean Sea lie to the northwest. South America has an area of approximately 17,840,000 square kilometres (6,890,000 sq mi), or almost 3.5% of Earth's surface. As of 2018, its population is more than 430 million, according to estimates of population in The World Factbook. South America ranks fourth among all continents in area (after Asia, Africa, and North America) and fifth in population (after Asia, Africa, Europe, and North America).

The border between North and South America is at some point in the Isthmus of Panama. The most common demarcation in atlases and other sources follows the Darién Mountains watershed that divides along the Colombia–Panama border where the isthmus meets the South American continent (see Darién Gap). Virtually all atlases list Panama as a state falling entirely within North America and/or Central America.

Sovereign states

A sovereign state is a political association with effective sovereignty over a population for whom it makes decisions in the national interest. According to the Montevideo Convention, a state must have a permanent population, a defined territory, a government, and the capacity to enter into relations with other states. The following states are all members of the United Nations and current or former members of the Union of South American Nations.

Non-sovereign territories

External territories

Internal territory

Economic statistics

† Geographically associated with Antarctica, but due to geopolitical reasons, the United Nations geoscheme has included Bouvet Island and South Georgia and the South Sandwich Islands in South America instead.

See also
List of South American countries by population
List of South American countries by population density
List of South American countries by GDP per capita
List of South American countries by GDP (PPP)
List of predecessors of sovereign states in South America
List of sovereign states and dependent territories in the Americas

Notes

References

South America
 
South America-related lists
Lists of countries in the Americas
South America